Siderone is a Neotropical nymphalid butterfly genus in the subfamily Charaxinae.

Species
 Siderone galanthis (Cramer, [1775]) – scarlet leafwing, red-and-black leafwing, or red-striped leafwing
 Siderone nemesis (Illiger, 1801) – Nemesis
 Siderone syntyche Hewitson, 1854 – red-patched leafwing

External links
"Siderone Hübner, [1823]" at Markku Savela's Lepidoptera and Some Other Life Forms

Anaeini
Nymphalidae of South America
Taxa named by Jacob Hübner
Butterfly genera